Minonk is a city in Minonk Township, Woodford County, Illinois, United States. The population was 2,078 at the 2010 census, down from 2,168 in 2000. It is part of the Peoria, Illinois Metropolitan Statistical Area.

Geography

Minonk is located at  (40.902357, -89.035992).

Climate

Demographics

At the 2000 census, there were 2,168 people, 841 households and 587 families residing in the city. The racial makeup of the city was 98.99% White, 0.05% African American, 0.05% Asian, 0.28% from other races, and 0.65% from two or more races. Hispanic or Latino of any race were 1.20% of the population.

There were 841 households, of which 31.9% had children under the age of 18 living with them, 57.9% were married couples living together, 9.2% had a female householder with no husband present, and 30.2% were non-families. 26.8% of all households were made up of individuals, and 15.6% had someone living alone who was 65 years of age or older. The average household size was 2.50 and the average family size was 3.02.

25.9% of the population were under the age of 18, 6.9% from 18 to 24, 27.5% from 25 to 44, 19.0% from 45 to 64, and 20.8% who were 65 years of age or older. The median age was 39 years. For every 100 females, there were 91.4 males. For every 100 females age 18 and over, there were 86.0 males.

The median household income was $44,028 and the median family income was $50,379. Males had a median income of $35,859 compared with $22,500 for females. The per capita income for the city was $17,688. About 7.0% of families and 8.6% of the population were below the poverty line, including 12.9% of those under age 18 and 7.7% of those age 65 or over.

History
The founding of Minonk corresponds with the construction of the Illinois Central Railroad.  The Illinois Central Railroad main line was completed in 1854 and ran through Section Seven, eventually becoming the City of Minonk. The plat of the town was first recorded on November 7, 1854.

David Neal, an agent with the Illinois Central Railroad, is credited for naming the city.  Local folklore provides varying accounts about the origins of the name “Minonk.” One version states that he originally named the area after a street in Boston, MA, where he owned property. A second story suggests that he changed the name of the settlement, originally referred to as “Marquette” on old French maps, to the Ojibwe word “Minonk,” meaning “a good place.”  Minonk is the only city in the world with that name.

Early settlers were attracted to Minonk by a variety of livelihoods.  Many came to work on the railroad. Others settled in the area to farm on the abundant, rich farmland. However, coal mining was the leading industry in the early years of Minonk. The first coal mines were developed in the 1860s, and at one point employed over 300 men. Two mines operated in Minonk: the first mine was located on the north edge of the city, and the second was situated a half-mile north of town.

Sports
Minonk, Illinois is home to Fieldcrest High School and their football team the Fieldcrest Knights.

Notes

References
Schneider, Alice Hayes.  Tales from the Trees.  Minonk, IL: Schneider, 1981.

Cities in Illinois
Cities in Woodford County, Illinois
Peoria metropolitan area, Illinois
Populated places established in 1854
1854 establishments in Illinois